= Austronesian =

Austronesian may refer to:

- The Austronesian languages
- The historical Austronesian peoples who carried Austronesian languages on their migrations
